Đà Nẵng (HQ-186) is a  of the Vietnam People's Navy. She is one of six Kilo-class submarines in service with Vietnam.

References 

Submarines of the Vietnam People's Navy
Kilo-class submarines
Attack submarines
2014 ships